Howardiina is a subtribe of armored scale insects.

Genera
Ambigaspis
Ferrisidea
Howardia
Hulaspis
Kandraspis
Multispinaspis
Paradiaspis
Paraepidiaspis
Parapudaspis
Praecocaspis
Pudaspis

References

Lepidosaphidini